Thor Sverre Nilsen  (born 5 October 1931) is a Norwegian competition rower. He competed in the 1952 Summer Olympics.

References

External links

1931 births
Living people 
Sportspeople from Bærum  
Norwegian male rowers
Olympic rowers of Norway
Rowers at the 1952 Summer Olympics

http://www.doddsworld.org/Doddsworld.org/Books_-_Thor_Nilsen.html